Gallery of Fear is a 2013 four-part horror anthology, directed by Alan Rowe Kelly and Anthony G. Summer. Kelly also wrote the screenplay for the film based on a story by Doug Smith. The film stars Debbie Rochon, Raine Brown, and Susan Adriensen.  The four segments of the anthology are titled "Critics Choice," "By Her Hand, She Draws You Down," "Down the Drain," and "A Far Cry from Home." The film was distributed by Southpaw Pictures and Tiny Core Pictures.

References

External links
 

2013 horror films
2013 films